Samuel Marcus Adler (1898 New York City - 1979 New York City) was an American artist.

Early life and education
He studied at the National Academy of Design, with Leon Kroll and Charles Hinton. He was Professor of Art at the New York University and the University of Illinois. He was a visiting professor at the University of Georgia.

Career
His work was exhibited at the Art Institute of Chicago, Corcoran Gallery of Art, Metropolitan Museum of Art, Whitney Museum, and the Smithsonian American Art Museum. His papers are held at the Archives of American Art.

Bibliography
Samuel Adler: recent collages, Georgia Museum of Art, 1968
Samuel M. Adler: 25 years of the image of man '47-'72, Frank Rehn Gallery, 1972

References

External links
"Samuel Adler interview, 1964 Mar. 12", Archives of American Art
https://web.archive.org/web/20120328053758/http://www.hammersby.com/products/samuel-marcus-adler-untitled/
http://www.arcadja.com/auctions/en/adler_samuel_marcus/artist/91238/
http://www.askart.com/askart/a/samuel_marcus_adler/samuel_marcus_adler.aspx

1898 births
1979 deaths
National Academy of Design alumni
New York University faculty
University of Illinois faculty
20th-century American painters
American male painters
University of Georgia faculty
Painters from New York City
20th-century American male artists